The Royal Eye Hospital was established in 1857 by John Zachariah Laurence and Carsten Holthouse as the South London Ophthalmic Hospital.

The hospital originally consisted of two beds in a house in St George's Circus.  An adjoining house was acquired and the enlarged facilities were renamed the Surrey Ophthalmic Hospital in 1860. Three years later it became the Ophthalmic Hospital, with a further name change to the Royal South London Ophthalmic Hospital in 1869. In 1892 following the opening of a new enlarged building, designed by the architects Young and Hall, still in St George's Circus, it finally became known as the Royal Eye Hospital.

After the NHS
In 1948 the hospital was incorporated into the newly founded National Health Service (NHS). It was originally allocated to the King's College Hospital Group
During the reorganisation of the NHS in 1974, the REH was reallocated to the St Thomas' Hospital Group. After the provision of Ophthalmic medicine had taken in-house by St Thomas' Hospital, such services were stopped at the St George's Circus site. The building was used by local Area Health Authorities before being left derelict and then demolished. The site is now occupied by McLaren House, which is one of hall of residences for students at London South Bank University.

References

Defunct hospitals in London
Hospitals established in 1857
1857 establishments in England